Sven Kristian Barthel (8 September 1903 in Botkyrka – 30 September 1991 in Stockholm) was a Swedish writer, journalist, theatre critic and translator.

He was a great narrator of nature, with a special interest in Stockholm's archipelago. He has translated, among other works, Of Mice and Men by John Steinbeck.

Barthel was married to Viveka Starfeldt, she was also a writer.

References

1903 births
1991 deaths
Swedish writers
Swedish theatre critics
Swedish translators
Dobloug Prize winners
20th-century Swedish journalists
20th-century translators